Miathyria is a Neotropical genus of dragonflies. They are commonly known as Hyacinth Gliders. One species, M. marcella, occurs in North America. They are associated with floating plants, especially Water Hyacinth or Water Lettuce.

The genus contains only two species:
Miathyria marcella  - Hyacinth Glider
Miathyria simplex  - Dwarf Glider

References

Libellulidae
Anisoptera genera
Taxa named by William Forsell Kirby